The Journal of Library Administration is a peer-reviewed academic journal that covers library management. It was established in 1980 and is published 8 times a year by Routledge. The editor-in-chief is Gary M. Pitkin (University of Northern Colorado).

Controversy 
In March 2013, the editor-in-chief Damon Jaggars (Columbia University) and the complete editorial board resigned in protest of the limited authors' rights offered by the publisher under its copyright licensing terms. After negotiations by the editorial board with the publisher on behalf of authors committed to open access, the best offer made for publishing under a Creative Commons license was payment of nearly $3,000 by the author for each article, which was judged unacceptable by Jaggars and the board. Board member Chris Bourg wrote of a "crisis of conscience about publishing in a journal that was not open access" after the suicide of open access activist Aaron Swartz.

Abstracting and indexing 
The journal is abstracted and indexed in CSA databases, EBSCOhost, Education Resources Information Center, Inspec, and  ProQuest.

References

External links 
 

Library science journals
Publications established in 1980
English-language journals
Routledge academic journals